Ingerophrynus claviger is a species of toad in the family Bufonidae. It is endemic to Indonesia where it is found on Sumatra and Nias island.
It is found in lowland forests. It is threatened by habitat loss.

References

claviger
Fauna of Sumatra
Endemic fauna of Indonesia
Amphibians of Indonesia
Amphibians described in 1863
Taxa named by Wilhelm Peters
Taxonomy articles created by Polbot